= NASCAR (disambiguation) =

NASCAR is an American auto racing sanctioning body and company.

NASCAR may also refer to:

- The NASCAR Cup Series
- The NASCAR Xfinity Series
- The NASCAR Camping World Truck Series
- The NASCAR Whelen Modified Tour
